PAEEK (short for Ποδοσφαιρική Αθλητική Ένωση Επαρχίας Κερύνειας, Podosfairiki Athlitiki Enosi Eparxeias Kerynias, translated as "Football and Sport Union of Kyrenia District", literally "Footballing Sportive Union of the District of Kyrenia") is a Cypriot sports club founded in Kyrenia in 1953 by graduates of Kyrenia Gymnasium and represented the first force to be reckoned from the small city. It now plays in exile in Nicosia since the Turkish invasion of Cyprus in July 1974. This union has football division competing in the Cypriot First Division. PAEEK used to have also a basketball division, but due to economic difficulties had to suspend it for some years up to date.

Basketball 

The PAEEK was a founding member of the Cyprus Basketball Federation in 1966 rising to fame in the early 1970s after its basketball division won the Cyprus top division basketball league in 3 consecutive years.

The PAEEK reached the Cyprus Basketball Cup final on 5 occasions, losing them all. 1995 was APOEL's year, when they took the basketball double. As losers of the Cup final, PAEEK automatically qualified to represent Cyprus in Europe in the Saporta Cup. They were knocked out by PAOK BC Salonika, which in turn went on to reach the final of the competition. The game with PAOK BC was very special for both teams, as they were all refugees and victims of the wars between Greece and Turkey.

Football 
The football team has not matched the basketball team's success in terms of trophies. They have been a mainstay in the Cyprus Second Division. Paeek is considered to be the team with the most appearances in the Cyprus Second Division, with 41 in total. The club plays its home matches in Keryneia Epistrofi Stadium in Nicosia, Cyprus.

PAEEK has built a reputation for unearthing young talent and moving them on, most notably Alexandros Paschalakis of PAOK and the Greece national team, Giorgos Economides and Giorgos Papadopoulos.

Promotion to Top Division 

During the 2020–21 season, PAEEK finished as champions of the second division and were promoted to the top division for the first time in club history.

Current squad

Colours 
The colours of PAEEK shirt are symbolic, with the black symbolising the sadness from the Turkish invasion in 1974 and the white symbolises the hope that one day they will return to their hometown. When this happens the colours will change back to yellow and black as they were before the Turkish invasion.

Honours

Basketball 
Cyprus Basketball Division 1
Winner (3): 1970, 1971 and 1972.
Cypriot Basketball Cup
Runner-up (5): 1969, 1970, 1971, 1995, 1999.

Football 
Cypriot Second Division
Winners (1): 2020–21
Cypriot Third Division
Winners (3): 1991–92, 2002–03, 2007–08

References

External links 
 Official website
 The history of PAEEK – The First Ten Years – PDF 

 
Basketball teams in Cyprus
Football clubs in Cyprus
Association football clubs established in 1953
1953 establishments in Cyprus